The surname Kendall, Kendl, or Kendal (also spelt Kendell, Kendoll, Kendel, Kendle, Kindell, Kindel, or Kindle) has two widely accepted origins. The first is from the market town of Kendal in Cumbria. The earliest recorded form of this town's name is in 1095 as Kircabikendala, literally "Church by Kent dale". The second is as an anglicization of Middle Welsh Kyndelw (modern Welsh Cynddelw), a given name, as in Cynddelw Brydydd Mawr (Kyndelw Brydyt Maur).

Kendall is a gender-neutral name of British origin. Traditionally a surname, it means "the Kent river valley." Kent is a region in southwest England known as the "garden of England" due to its thriving horticulture scene.

Kendall
The name Kendall may refer to:
Alan Kendall (born 1944), English musician and lead guitarist for the Bee Gees
Amos Kendall (1789–1869), American politician and U.S. postmaster general under Andrew Jackson and Martin Van Buren
Arnold Kendall (1925–2003), English footballer
Arthur Samuel Kendall (1861–1944), Canadian physician
Austin Kendall (born 1997), American football player
Barbara Kendall (born 1967), New Zealand boardsailor
Bill Kendall (ice hockey) (1910–1996), Canadian hockey player
Brian Kendall (boxer) (1948–1998), New Zealand boxer
Bridget Kendall (born 1956), English radio correspondent
Bruce Biers Kendall (1919–2012), American politician
Bruce Kendall (born 1964), New Zealand Olympian
Carl Kendall, Canadian hockey player
Carol Kendall (1917–2012), American children's author
Cate Kendall, pen name used by Australian novelists Michelle Hammer and Lisa Blundell
Charles West Kendall (1828–1914), American politician and entrepreneur
Charlie Kendall (born 1935), American football player
Cy Kendall (1898–1953), American actor
Dave Kendall, British-American journalist
David E. Kendall (born 1944), American attorney who represented Bill Clinton in the Lewinsky scandal and impeachment
David George Kendall (1918–2007), English statistician
Denise Huxtable Kendall, fictional character from the sitcom The Cosby Show
David Kendall (born 1957), American television director
Donald M. Kendall (1921–2020), American businessman and former CEO of Pepsi
Edward Calvin Kendall (1886–1972), American chemist
Edward H. Kendall (1842–1901), American architect
Edward "Ned" Kendall (1808–1861), American bandleader and musician (bugle)
Edward Nicholas Kendall (1800–1845), English hydrographer
Elton Joe Kendall (born 1954), American judge
Elva R. Kendall (1893–1968), U.S. representative
Ezra Kendall (1861–1910), American actor-comedian, humorist, playwright and author
Ezra Otis Kendall (1818–1899), American professor, astronomer and mathematician
Frank Kendall III (born 1949), American attorney
Fred Kendall (born 1949), American baseball player
Gary Kendall, Canadian musician and lead bassist for the Downchild Blues Band.
George H. Kendall (c. 1854 – 1924), president of the New York Bank Note Company
George Kennedy (born "George Kendall"; 1881–1921), Canadian sports promoter and owner of the Montreal Canadiens
Graham Kendall (born 1961), English academic and professor of computer science at the University of Nottingham
Henry Edward Kendall (1776–1875), English architect
Henry Ernest Kendall (1864–1949), lieutenant governor of Nova Scotia
Henry George Kendall (1874–1965), English sea captain
Henry Kendall (actor) (1897–1962), English actor
Henry Kendall (ornithologist) (1849–1934), English-Australian ornithologist
Henry Kendall (poet) (1839–1882), an Australian poet.
Henry Way Kendall (1926–1999), American particle physicist and Nobel Laureate
Holliday Bickerstaffe Kendall (1844–1919), an English Primitive Methodist minister
Howard Kendall (1946–2015), English footballer
James Kendall (chemist) (1889–1978), English chemist
James Kendall (politician) (1647–1708), English soldier, Member of Parliament and Governor of Barbados
Jason Kendall (born 1974), American baseball player
Jo Kendall (1938–2022), English actress
Joe Kendall (American football) (1909–1965), American football player
John D. Kendall, American educator and promoter of the Suzuki method
John W. Kendall (1934–1992), U.S. representative
Jonas Kendall (1757–1844), U.S. representative
Joseph G. Kendall (1788–1847), U.S. representative
Joseph M. Kendall (1863–1933), U.S. representative
Kate Kendall (born 1973), Australian actress
Kay Kendall (1926–1959), American actress
Ken Kendall (1884–1969), Australian footballer
Kenneth Kendall (1924–2012), British radio and television broadcaster
Kerri Kendall (born 1970), American model and actress
King Kendall, American vocalist and videogame designer
Larcum Kendall (1719–1790), British watchmaker

Levon Kendall (born 1984), Canadian basketballer
Liz Kendall (born 1971), British Member of Parliament (MP)
Luke Kendall (1981), Australian professional basketball player
Malcolm Kendall-Smith (born 1968 or 1969), former medical officer in the British Royal Air Force, born in Australia, raised in New Zealand, has dual British-New Zealand citizenship
Maria Kendall, fictional character on the BBC television series Holby City, portrayed by actress Phoebe Thomas
Marie Kendall (1873–1964), British music hall comedian and actress
Mark Kendall (footballer, born 1958) (1958–2008), Welsh footballer 
Mark Kendall (footballer, born 1961), English former professional footballer
 Mark Kendall (born 1957), American guitarist for the band Great White
Maurice Kendall (1907–1983), English statistician
May Kendall (born Emma Goldworth Kendall) (1861–1943), English poet, novelist, and satirist
Megyn Kelly (formerly "Megyn Kendall") (born 1970), is a journalist, former attorney, and news pundit and political commentator
Nathan E. Kendall (1868–1936), American politician
Nicholas Kendall (Conservative politician) (1800–1878), MP for East Cornwall
Nicholas Kendall (priest) (died 1740), Bishop of Crediton and Bishop of Plymouth
Nicholas Kendall (Royalist) (1577–1643), MP for Lostwithiel
Paul Kendall (born 1954), British audio engineer
Paul Murray Kendall (1911–1973), American academic and historian
Paul Wilkins Kendall (1898–1983), American army commander
Percy Fry Kendall (1856–1936), English geologist
Pete Kendall (born 1973), former American football guard
Peter Kendall (born 1938), former English cricketer
Raymond Kendall (born 1933), British law enforcement officer
Richard Kendall Brooke (1930–1996), South African ornithologist
Robert Kendall (disambiguation), multiple people
Roy Kendall (1899–1972), English-born Australian politician and intelligence agent
R. T. Kendall (born 1935), English Christian writer, speaker, and teacher
Ryan Kendall (born 1989), English footballer
Samuel Austin Kendall (1859–1933), American politician
Sarah Kendall Australian comedian who moved to the UK in 2000
Skip Kendall (born 1964), American professional golfer
Suzy Kendall (born Frieda Harrison, 1944), British actress
Thomas Kendall (1778–1832), New Zealand lapsed missionary, recorder of the Māori language, schoolmaster, arms dealer, and Pākehā Māori.
Tim Kendall (born 1970), English poet and literary magazine founder, editor and critic
Toggie Kendall (1878–1915), rugby union player and captain
Tom Kendall (1851–1924), English-born Australian cricketer
Tommy Kendall (born 1966), American race car driver and television broadcaster
Tony Kendall (disambiguation), multiple people
Virginia Mary Kendall, born 1962, American federal judge
William Denis Kendall (1903–1995), British Member of Parliament
William Kendall (disambiguation), multiple people
Willmoore Kendall (1909–1967), American conservative writer and professor of political philosophy

Kendal
The name Kendal may refer to:
Felicity Kendal (born 1946), English television actress
Geoffrey Kendal (1910–1988), English actor and theatre manager; father of Felicity Kendal
Jennifer Kendal (1933–1984), British actress; sister of Felicity Kendal
John Kendal (c. 1400 – 1485), secretary to Richard III of England
Madge Kendal (1848–1935), English actress
Norman Kendal, (1880–1966), English barrister and senior police officer
William Hunter Kendal (1843–1917), English actor

Kendell
The name Kendell may refer to:
Don Kendell
Ebenezer Kendell
Julia Kendell
Kate Kendell
Robert Evan Kendell
William Kendell

Kendle
The name Kendle may refer to:
Charles Kendle
William Kendle

Kindell
The name Kindell may refer to:
Billy Zoom (born "Tyson Kindell")

Kindel
The name Kindel may refer to:
George John Kindel
Steve Kindel

Kindle
The name Kindle may refer to:
Sergio Kindle

English-language surnames
English toponymic surnames